Toronto Transportation Commission (TTC) was the public transit operator in Toronto, Ontario, Canada, beginning in 1921. It operated buses, streetcars and the island ferries. The system was renamed the Toronto Transit Commission (TTC) in 1954.

History

Toronto's first public transportation company was the Williams Omnibus Bus Line and owned by undertaker Burt Williams. The franchise carried passengers in horse-drawn stagecoaches along Yonge Street between the St. Lawrence Market and the village of Yorkville for sixpence in 1849. The city granted the first franchise for a street railway in 1861 to Alexander Easton under the franchise of Toronto Street Railways (TSR) and Metropolitan Street Railway of Toronto (MSR) in 1885. In 1891, the franchise was passed onto William Mackenzie's Toronto Railway Company for 30 years.  Outside of the city there were a number of other operators, including:

 Toronto and York Radial Railway
 Toronto Suburban Railway

Prior to the establishment of the TTC, the City of Toronto operated its own system under the Toronto Civic Railways (TCR). However, the TCR routes were operating in areas not served by the private TRC. In 1920, a Provincial Act created the Toronto Transportation Commission (TTC) and, in 1921, the Commission took over and amalgamated nine existing fare systems within the city limits. Between 1921 and 1953, the TTC added 35 new routes in the city and extended 20 more. It also operated 23 suburban routes on a service-for-cost basis. It abandoned money-losing radial railway line (known as 'interurbans' elsewhere in the continent), North Yonge Railways.

The Great Depression and the Second World War both placed heavy burdens on the ability of municipalities to finance themselves. During most of the 1930s, municipal governments had to cope with general welfare costs and assistance to the unemployed. The TTC realized that improvements had to be made despite the depression and in 1936 purchased the first of the newly developed PCC streetcars. The war put an end to the depression and increased migration from rural to urban areas. After the war, municipalities faced the problem of extending services to accommodate the increased population. Ironically, the one municipal service that prospered during the war years was public transit; employers had to stagger work hours in order to avoid overcrowding the streetcars. Toronto continued their program of purchasing PCC cars, running the world's largest fleet, including many obtained second-hand from U.S. cities that abandoned streetcar service.

With the creation of Metro Toronto in 1954 and the building of the Yonge subway line, the Toronto Transportation Commission was renamed the Toronto Transit Commission.

Streetcar
The Toronto Transportation Commission was mainly a streetcar operator and this remained the core operations before 1954:

All remaining Toronto Railway Company cars as of 1921 and all Toronto Civic Railways cars as of 1921 was absorbed into the TTC. Some older wooden cars were retired due to wear and replaced by Peter Witt orders.

Buses
Buses are a large part of the TTC operations today, but before the 1960s they played a lesser role to streetcar operations. Bus service in Toronto started in 1921, but it was not until the creation of the TTC that buses become a part of public transit. There were a few independent bus operators that continued to provide inter-urban bus services:

 Hollinger Bus Lines (East York and Scarborough 1921–1954)
 Danforth Bus Lines (Scarborough, North York and York 1926–1954)
 West York Coach Lines  (York, Etobicoke and Malton 1946–1954)
 Roseland Bus Lines (York, Weston-Woodbridge 1925–1954)

Here is a list of historic and current buses used by the old TTC:

Suburban and inter-urban buses
Gray Coach Lines was suburban bus operator founded in 1927 by the Toronto Transit Commission. Gray Coach used inter-urban coaches to link Toronto to outlying areas throughout Southern Ontario. In addition, Gray Coach operated tour bus operations in association with Gray Line tours. The main terminal was at the Toronto Bus Terminal on Elizabeth Street, downtown.

Here is a list of historic and current buses used by the Gray Coach:

Trolley bus lines

The TTC once operated trolley buses on 10 routes, mostly on downtown routes and a few in the northern limits of the City of Toronto. The first route began operation with four buses on June 19, 1922, from a shed on Merton St. This early trolley coach operation was replaced by a streetcar line. In later years, many of these routes replaced streetcar routes, using the old overhead power system which was adapted to dipole service. The buses consisted of a standard bus platform with electric motors with two trolley poles connected to electrical lines above.

Routes served by trolley buses included:

 4 Annette 
6 Bay
40 Junction
 47 Lansdowne
 61 Nortown (later 61/103)
 63 Ossington
74 Mt. Pleasant
 89 Weston
 97 Yonge

Island Ferry

In 1926, the City of Toronto purchased the ferry services operated by the Toronto Ferry Company. The fleet was transferred to the TTC, which engaged in a modernization program, retiring the smaller older vessels, and purchasing modern, diesel-powered ferries which still provide the backbone of modern service to the Islands.

See also
 Toronto Transit Commission

References

 The TTC Story by Mike Filey
 Not A One Horse Town by Mike Filey
 Reflections & Recollections Transfer Points January 2005
 Independents Take Over – TTC Goes Metro Wide Transfer Points August–September 2004
 Toronto Transit Commission Goes Metro Wide Transfer Point December 2004
 TTC Archives

External links
Official TTC site
News, history and discussion
Transit Toronto – Trolley Buses
Transit Toronto Buses
Transit Toronto Streetcar
 Gray Coach Roster
 Toronto Ferries
Tom's North American Trolleybuses – Toronto page

Toronto Transit Commission
Ferry companies of Ontario
Defunct intermodal transport authorities